5G network slicing is a network architecture that enables the multiplexing of virtualized and independent logical networks on the same physical network infrastructure. Each network slice is an isolated end-to-end network tailored to fulfil diverse requirements requested by a particular application.

For this reason, this technology assumes a central role to support 5G mobile networks that are designed to efficiently embrace a plethora of services with very different service level requirements (SLR). The realization of this service-oriented view of the network leverages on the concepts of software-defined networking (SDN) and network function virtualization (NFV) that allow the implementation of flexible and scalable network slices on top of a common network infrastructure.

From a business model perspective, each network slice is administrated by a mobile virtual network operator (MVNO). The infrastructure provider (the owner of the telecommunication infrastructure) leases its physical resources to the MVNOs that share the underlying physical network. According to the availability of the assigned resources, a MVNO can autonomously deploy multiple network slices that are customized to the various applications provided to its own users.

History
The history of network slicing can be tracked back to the late 80s with the introduction of the concept of "slice" in the networking field. Overlay networks provided the first form of network slicing since heterogeneous network resources were combined to create virtual networks over a common infrastructure. However, they lacked a mechanism that could enable their programmability.

In the early 2000s, PlanetLab introduced a virtualization framework that allowed groups of users to program network functions in order to obtain isolated and application-specific slices. The advent of SDN technologies in 2009 further extended the programmability capabilities via open interfaces that enabled the realization of fully configurable and scalable network slices.

In the context of mobile networks, network slicing evolved from the concept of RAN sharing that was initially introduced in LTE standard. Examples of such technology are multi-operator radio access networks (MORAN) and multi-operator core networks (MOCN), which allow network operators to share common LTE resources within the same radio access network (RAN).

Key concepts
The "one-size-fits-all" network paradigm employed in the past mobile networks (2G, 3G and 4G) is no longer suited to efficiently address a market model composed of very different applications like machine-type communication, ultra reliable low latency communication and enhanced mobile broadband content delivery.

Network slicing emerges as an essential technique in 5G networks to accommodate such different and possibly contrasting quality of service (QoS) requirements exploiting a single physical network infrastructure.

The basic idea of network slicing is to "slice" the original network architecture in multiple logical and independent networks that are configured to effectively meet the various services requirements. To quantitatively realize such concept, several techniques are employed:

 Network functions: they express elementary network functionalities that are used as "building blocks" to create every network slice.
 Virtualization: it provides an abstract representation of the physical resources under a unified and homogeneous scheme. In addition, it enables a scalable slice deployment relying on NFV that allows the decoupling of each network function instance from the network hardware it runs on.
 Orchestration: it is a process that allows coordination of all the different network components that are involved in the life-cycle of each network slice. In this context, SDN is employed to enable a dynamic and flexible slice configuration.

Impact and applications
In commercial terms, network slicing allows a mobile operator to create specific virtual networks that cater to particular clients and use cases. Certain applications - such as mobile broadband, machine-to-machine communications (e.g. in manufacturing or logistics), or smart cars - will benefit from leveraging different aspects of 5G technology. One might require higher speeds, another low latency, and yet another access to edge computing resources. By creating separate slices that prioritise specific resources a 5G operator can offer tailored solutions to particular industries. Some sources insist this will revolutionise industries like marketing, augmented reality, or mobile gaming, while others are more cautious, pointing to unevenness in network coverage and poor reach of advantages beyond increased speed.

Slicing will be very useful to MVNOs as different use cases can be supported in a layer  based on parameters  like low latency high speed for video streaming for OTT focused MVNOs,  similarly telemetry operations could have lower speed parameter and as on.

Slicing can also enhance service continuity via improved roaming across networks, by creating a virtual network running on physical infrastructure that spans multiple local or national networks; or by allowing a host network to create an optimised virtual network which replicates the one offered by a roaming device's home network.

Architecture overview

Although there are different proposals of network slice architectures, it is possible to define a general architecture that maps the common elements of each solution into a general and unified framework. From a high-level perspective, the network slicing architecture can be considered as composed of two mains blocks, one dedicated to the actual slice implementation and the other dedicated to the slice management and configuration. The first block is designed as a multi-tier architecture composed by three layers (service layer, network function layer, infrastructure layer), where each one contributes to the slice definition and deployment with distinct tasks. The second block is designed as a centralized network entity, generically denoted as network slice controller, that monitors and manages the functionalities between the three layers in order to efficiently coordinate the coexistence of multiple slices.

Service layer
The service layer interfaces directly with the network business entities (e.g. MVNOs and 3rd party service providers) that share the underlying physical network and it provides a unified vision of the service requirements. Each service is formally represented as service instance, which embeds all the network characteristics in the form of SLA requirements that are expected to be fully satisfied by a suitable slice creation.

Network function layer 
The network function layer is in charge of the creation of each network slice according to service instance requests coming from the upper layer. It is composed by a set of network functions that embody well-defined behaviors and interfaces. Multiple network functions are placed over the virtual network infrastructure and chained together to create an end-to-end network slice instance that reflects the network characteristics requested by the service. The configuration of the network functions are performed by means of a set of network operations that allow management of their full life-cycle (from their placement when a slice is created to their de-allocation when the function provided is no longer needed).

To increase resource usage efficiency, the same network function can be simultaneously shared by different slices at the cost of an increase in the complexity of operations management. Conversely, a one-to-one mapping between each network function and each slice eases the configuration procedures, but can lead to poor and inefficient resource usage.

Infrastructure layer
The infrastructure layer represents the actual physical network topology (radio access network, transport network and core network) upon which every network slice is multiplexed and it provides the physical network resources to host the several network functions composing each slice.

The network domain of the available resources includes a heterogeneous set of infrastructure components like data centers (storage and computation capacity resources), devices enabling network connectivity such as routers (networking resources) and base stations (radio bandwidth resources).

Network slice controller
The network slice controller is defined as a network orchestrator, which interfaces with the various functionalities performed by each layer to coherently manage each slice request. The benefit of such network element is that it enables an efficient and flexible slice creation that can be reconfigured during its life-cycle. Operationally, the network slice controller is in charge of several tasks that provide a more effective coordination between the aforementioned layers:

End-to-end service management: mapping of the various service instances expressed in terms of SLA requirements with suitable network functions capable of satisfying the service constraints.
Virtual resources definition: virtualization of the physical network resources in order to simplify the resources management operations performed to allocate network functions.
Slice life-cycle management: slice performance monitoring across all the three layers in order to dynamically reconfigure each slice to accommodate possible SLA requirements modifications.

Due to the complexity of the performed tasks which address different purposes, the network slice controller can be composed by multiple orchestrators that independently manage a subset of functionalities of each layer. To fulfill the service requirements, the various orchestration entities need to coordinate with each other by exchanging high-level information about the state of the operations involved in the slice creation and deployment.

Slice isolation
Slice isolation is an important requirement that allows enforcing the core concept of network slicing about the simultaneous coexistence of multiple slices sharing the same infrastructure. This property is achieved by imposing that each slice's performance must not have any impact on the other slice's performance. The benefit of this design choice is that enhances the network slice architecture in two main aspects:

 Slice security: cyber-attacks or faults occurrences affect only the target slice and have limited impact on the life-cycle of other existing slices.
 Slice privacy: private information related to each slice (e.g. user statistics, MVNO business model) are not shared among other slices.

Guaranteeing QoS 
Slicing has become an important part of 5G networks, but we don't have to forget to guarantee the QoS. Some studies have demonstrated that formulating the problem with the QoS as a stochastic problem, permit us to maximize the average throughput of the AP, while satisfying the constraints related to the QoS.

See also
 APN
 NGAP
 5G
 Network virtualization
 Software-defined networking
Network orchestration
 Network service
 5G NR frequency bands

References

Network architecture
Emerging technologies
5G (telecommunication)